Giovanni Domenico Cerrini (1609–1681), also called Gian Domenico Cerrini or il Cavalier Perugino, was a painter of the Baroque period, born in Perugia and active mainly in Rome and influenced in large part by painters of the Bolognese School.

Biography
Cerrini initially apprenticed under Giovanni Antonio Scaramuccia, then in 1638 moved into the Roman studio of Guido Reni. He was anyway strongly influenced also by Lanfranco, Guercino, Domenichino and Andrea Sacchi. He was patronized by the family of Cardinal Bernardino Spada. Cardinal Giulio Rospigliosi gave him the commission to decorate the cupola of Santa Maria della Vittoria (1654–1655).

Paintings of his can be found in many of the churches of Rome, where he died, including Santa Maria in Traspontina, San Carlino alle Quattro Fontane, Santa Maria in Vallicella, San Carlo ai Catinari, Santissimo Sudario dei Piemontesi, Sant'Isidoro, as well as in  Galleria Colonna, Palazzo Spada, and the Palazzo Corsini art gallery.

References

Web Gallery of Art biography.
Roman charity at Fondazione Cassa di Risparmio di Perugia.

1609 births
1681 deaths
People from Perugia
17th-century Italian painters
Italian male painters
Italian Baroque painters